Currie is a surname in the English language. The name has numerous origins.

Etymology

In some cases it originated as a habitational name, derived from Currie in Midlothian, Scotland. In other cases it originated as a habitational name, derived from Corrie, in Dumfriesshire, Scotland. A third origin for the surname is that it originated as a Scottish spelling of the Irish surname Curry, a surname which has several origins. A fourth origin of the surname, particularly on Arran, is as an Anglicised form of the Scottish Gaelic MacMhuirich. The Hebridean MacMhuirich evolved in such a way that the forms McVurich and McCurrie first appeared in the 17th century, and by the 18th century Currie is found on Islay, and on Uist by the 19th century. Another origin of the surname is from Curry, in Somerset, England. In some cases the name may also be derived from the Old French curie, which means "kitchen".

Early forms of the surname include: æt Curi, in about 1075; and de Cury, in 1212. Both forms are derived from the place name in Somerset. Other early forms include: atte Curie, in SRS 1327; and atte Corye. Early forms of the surname, derived from a Scottish place name, is de Curry, in 1179; and de Curri, in 1210. An early form of the surname, when derived from MacMhuirich is M'Currie and Currie, in the early 18th century.

It can be a Sept of Clan Donald or Clan Macpherson.

Persons with the surname
 Airese Currie (born 1982), American football player
 Alannah Currie (born 1957), New Zealand musician
 Alex Currie (1891–1951), Canadian hockey player and coach
 Archibald Currie (1888–1986), Surinamese politician 
 Arthur Currie (1875–1933), Canadian general
 Austin Currie (born 1939), Irish politician
 Balfour Currie (1902–1981), Canadian scientist
 Barbara Flynn Currie (born 1940), American politician
 Betty Currie (born 1939), secretary to Bill Clinton
 Blair Currie (born 1994), Scottish footballer
 Bill Currie (baseball) (1928–2013), American baseball player
 Billy Currie (born 1950), British musician
 Bob Currie (1918–1988), British motorcycle journalist
 Bob Currie (footballer), Scottish footballer
 Cameron Currie (born 1948), USA federal judge
 Cecil Currie (1861–1937), English cricketer
 Cherie Currie (born 1959), American rock singer
 Dan Currie (1935–2017), American football player
 Dan Currie (footballer) (1935–1992), Scottish footballer
 Darren Currie (born 1974), English footballer
 David Currie, Baron Currie of Marylebone (born 1946), British economist
 David Vivian Currie (1912–1986), Canadian Army officer
 Dennis H. Currie (1874–1928), American military officer
 Donald Currie (1825–1909), Scottish shipowner
 Duncan Currie (1892–1916), Scottish footballer
 Edwina Currie (born 1946), British politician
 Finlay Currie (1878–1968), Scottish actor
 Sir Frederick Currie, 1st Baronet (1799–1875), member of Supreme Council of India
 Reverend Sir Frederick Larkins Currie (1823–1900), English cricketer
 George Currie (1905–1978), Northern Ireland barrister and politician
 George Currie (born 1950), Scottish musician and amateur archaeologist
 George R. Currie (1900–1983), U.S. jurist and Wisconsin Chief Justice
 George Welsh Currie (1870–1950), British politician
 Gilbert A. Currie (1882–1960), U.S. politician
 Gordon Currie (disambiguation)
 Gordon Currie (born 1965), Canadian actor
 Gregory Currie, Australian philosopher
 Herschel Currie (born 1965), American gridiron football player
 James Currie (physician) (1756–1805), Scottish physician, biographer of Robert Burns
 James Currie (politician) (1827–1901), Canadian politician
 John Currie (disambiguation), several people
 John Cecil Currie (1898–1944), British World War Two Army officer
 Justin Currie (born 1964), Scottish singer-songwriter
 Ken Currie (born 1960), Scottish artist
 Lauchlin Currie (1902–1993), Canadian economist
 Louise Currie (1913–2013), American actress
 Marie Currie (born 1959), American rock singer
 Mark Currie (games developer)
 Mark John Currie (1795–1874), Vice-Admiral R.N. and founder settler in Western Australia
 Archbishop Martin William Currie (born 1943), Catholic prelate serving in Newfoundland and Labrador, Canada
 Michael Currie (actor) (1928–2009), American actor
 Monique Currie (born 1983), American basketball player
 Nancy J. Currie (born 1958), American astronaut
 Nicholas Currie (born 1960), Scottish musician
 Philip Currie, 1st Baron Currie (1834–1906), British diplomat
 Philip J. Currie (born 1949), Canadian paleontologist
 Raikes Currie (1801–1881), English politician
 Richard Currie (born 1937), Canadian businessman
 Sondra Currie (born 1947), American actress
 Steve Currie (1947–1981), bassist for T. Rex
 Tony Currie (broadcaster) (born 1951), Scottish broadcaster
 Tony Currie (footballer) (born 1950), English footballer
 Tony Currie (rugby league) (born 1962), Australian rugby league footballer
 Ulysses Currie (1937–2019), American politician
 William Currie (1756–1829), English politician and restorer of East Horsley

References

English-language surnames
Scottish surnames
Patronymic surnames
Toponymic surnames